Hiroaki Shiota is a Japanese politician who is a member of the House of Councillors of Japan.

Biography 
He graduated in 1984 from Akita University and has worked for Komei Shimbun. He holds several patents.

References

External links 
Twitter
Personal website

Living people
Members of the House of Councillors (Japan)
Politicians from Tokushima Prefecture
Akita University alumni
1962 births